Somalitayloria is a genus of air-breathing land snails, terrestrial pulmonate gastropod mollusks in the family Streptaxidae.

Distribution 
The distribution of the genus Somalitayloria includes:
 Somalia

Species
Species within the genus Somalitayloria include:

References

Endemic fauna of Somalia
Streptaxidae